Salomon Zender Langer (born 12 October 1936) is an Argentinian pharmacologist whose family had fled from Poland to Argentina in the early 1930s and were thus saved from the Holocaust during the Second World War.

Career
He was born in Buenos Aires, Argentina and graduated in 1960 from the School of Medicine of Buenos Aires University. Starting in 1963 with a Rockefeller Foundation Fellowship he joined the Department of Pharmacology at Harvard University until the end of 1966. His research was on the mechanisms involving denervation supersensitivity. with Ullrich Trendelenburg with whom he became lifelong friends.

He spent two years (1967-1969) in Cambridge, England with :de:Leslie Iversen and at the Institute of Animal Physiology with Marthe Vogt where he worked on norepinephrine(NE) uptake and the regulation of NE release elicited by nerve stimulation as well as the metabolic fate of the released neurotransmitter. In 1969, Dr. Langer returned to Argentina where he was appointed Director of the Institute for Pharmacological Research.

The work started in Cambridge continued at the Institute in Buenos Aires during the years 1969-1976, leading to the discovery of the presynaptic inhibitory Alpha-adrenoceptors on noradrenergic nerve terminals and their role in the modulation of the NE release during nerve stimulation

In 1974, Dr. Langer discovered the Alpha-2 adrenoceptors and characterized the pharmacological differences between alpha 1-adrenoceptors and alpha 2-adrenoceptors, establishing that the latter corresponded to the presynaptic auto-receptors

During the years 1975-1976, he provided the first extensive and rigorous evidence "in vitro" and "in vivo" of co-transmission (NE and ATP) in the cat's nicitating membrane. In the summer of 1976, Dr. Langer became Head of the Department of Pharmacology at the Wellcome Research Laboratories in Beckenham, Kent, UK and in 1976 he was appointed Director of Biology at :fr:Sanofi-Synthélabo Research in Paris where he was later became the Research Director and Vice-President.

The research team directed by Dr. Langer discovered between the years 1979-1980 a specific, high-affinity binding site labeled with for 3H-imipramine and later with 3H-paroxetine, which is associated with the serotonin transporter in the brain and in blood platelets of various species, including man. 3H-paroxetine binding was subsequently used as a marker in the purification of the serotonin transporter for cloning and expression.

Throughout the 80's Dr. Langer continued his work on presynaptic autoreceptors regulating NE, DA and 5-HT release and reported the interactions in neurotransmission between the neuronal transporter and the corresponding autoreceptor.

During the 23 years at Synthelabo, Dr. Langer discovered and developed five compounds : diltiazem, a calcium antagonist (for coronary insufficiency); betaxolol, a beta-1 adrenoceptor selective antagonist for hypertension and also for local use in the treatment of glaucoma; zolpidem , a selective full agonist of the alpha-1 subunit of the benzodiazepine-GABA-A receptor (for insomnia) and mizolastine, a peripherally acting histamine H-1 receptor antagonist which also inhibits the formation of leukotriens(for allergic diseases).

In 2000, Dr. Langer moved to Israel where he continued research projects in drug discovery for major depression and Alzheimer's disease. In 2014, Dr. Langer founded the drug company Synaptic Pharma Ltd to develop Eliprodil, a noncompetitive antagonist of the ionotropic NMDA receptor for a rapid onset antidepressant action in severely drug-resistant depressed patients.

Discoveries

Langer was the first to describe pre-synaptic autoreceptors for DA, 5HT, ACh, GABA and glutamate. He was among the first to demonstrate co-transmission in the 1970s  and also played a pivotal role in developing the atypical antipsychotic, aripiprazole.

Awards and prizes
Throughout his career Dr. Langer received many awards and prizes.
1962: Rockefeller Foundation Fellowship
1976: Guggenheim Fellowship for research in cardiovascular pharmacology
1977: Gaddum Memorial Lecture Award by the British Pharmacological Society
1980: G.E. Brown Memorial Lecture of the American Heart Association
1981:First International Prize of the Anna-Monika Foundation (Dortmund, West Germany) for research in the field of endogenous depression.
1986: Pythagoras Prize in Pharmacology. Mediterranea University of Reggio Calabria, Calabria, Italy.
1991:Otto Krayer Award in Pharmacology, presented by ASPET (American Society of Pharmacology and Experimental Therapeutics)
1991: Ciba Award in Hypertension, presented by the Council for High Blood Pressure of the American Heart Association, USA.
1993: Eli Lilly Award in Neuroscience from the European College of Neuropsychopharmacology(ECNP).
1999: Lieber Prize in Schizophrenia  presented by the National Alliance for Research on Schizophrenia and Depression (NARSAD), USA.
2000: ASPET Award of the American Society for Pharmacology and Experimental Therapeutics.
2002: Julius Axelrod Award Medal for research in the field of Catecholamines (ASPET).
2009: Mark Nickerson Memorial Lecture  at McGill University, Montreal, Quebec, Canada.
2009:Inaugural Norman Weiner Memorial Award by the International College of Neurophychopharmacology (CINP)
2010: Pioneers in Psychopharmacology Award by the in International College of Neurophsychopharmacology (CINP)

Publications
Dr. Langer is among the highly cited researchers in Pharmacology during the period of 1981-1999:ISI Highly cited. He is editor of several books and member of the editorial boards of several scientific journals. Dr. Langer has published more than 450 scientific articles and is holder of at least 21 patents in France, the United States and Japan.

Positions
In 1974, Dr. Langer was president of the Latin American Society of Pharmacology (ALF). From 1989 to 1992 he was president of the European College of Neuropsychopharmacology (ECNP) and from 1991 to 1998 he served as Vice-President of the International College of Neurophsychopharmacology (CINP) and was member of the Executive Committee of the World Federation of Societies of Biological Psychiatry (WFSPB) from 1991 to 1997. For the period of 2002 to 2006, Dr. Langer was the Treasurer and member of the Executive Committee of IUPHAR and between 2006 and 2010 First Vice President of IUPHAR.

References

1936 births
Living people
Harvard University alumni
Argentine scientists